Latka Gravas  is a fictional character on the television sitcom Taxi portrayed by Andy Kaufman. A sweet-natured and lovable-but-goofy mechanic, Latka was based on a character Kaufman created known as Foreign Man.

Development

Creation
In 1977, the producers of Taxi saw Kaufman's Foreign Man act at The Comedy Store. They had already created the main characters for the pilot but they enjoyed Kaufman so much they immediately offered him a role based on the character. Kaufman was not a fan of sitcoms, but his manager, George Shapiro, convinced him that this would rocket him to stardom, where he would make a lot of money which he could then put into his own act, which became Andy's Funhouse. Kaufman agreed to appear as Latka in 14 episodes per season, approximately half of the entire series. In the show, Latka's home country is never disclosed (only referred to as "[Latka's] country" or "the old country"), and his native language is essentially gibberish, although a few words and phrases were consistently used.  (Notably "Ibbi da" for "Yes" or "That is so".)  Some fans have theorized that Latka may be from a fictional Baltic country-island named Caspiar, which Kaufman claimed "Foreign Man" was from, but this was never explicitly addressed on any episode of Taxi.

"Tony Clifton"
One of Kaufman's conditions on being hired was that one of his other characters, Tony Clifton, be allowed to guest star in the series.  The producers were well aware that "Clifton" was an alter ego of Kaufman, but went along with the fiction that Clifton was a separate actor.  They signed Clifton to a separate contract, and announced to the cast that Clifton was being hired to portray the character of Louie's brother in the series' tenth episode.  

However, after the first day of rehearsal, the producers felt Kaufman-as-Clifton was not up to the acting challenge of playing the offered role.  Informed of this, Kaufman asked that "Clifton" be fired in public, ostensibly for coming to rehearsal late.  Clifton then showed up on set for the next day of filming, and was demanding, boorish and obnoxious; the producers not only fired Clifton, but threw him off the set after he caused havoc and enraged Judd Hirsch and Jeff Conaway.  The role was hurriedly recast, and when Kaufman (as himself) returned to work for the following episode, he acted as if nothing had happened.

Man on the Moon
Latka is portrayed by Jim Carrey in the Kaufman biopic Man on the Moon, in scenes redone from the original Taxi series, as Carrey was portraying Kaufman himself and other actors from Taxi portrayed themselves. Carrey won a Golden Globe Award for his performance.

Awards

Golden Globes
Kaufman was nominated for two Golden Globe Awards for his portrayal of Latka.

Fictional biography
In the first season, Latka's knowledge of the English language is extremely limited, and almost all of his lines are in his own language, to the point that he speaks his own language to the other characters when they answer him in English. From the second season onwards, his English has greatly improved and he is able to speak fluently with the other characters, but still with a heavy accent. In the second season, Latka becomes acquainted with Simka Dahblitz, a woman from his home country, and despite being from different ethnic groups who despise each other, Latka falls in love with Simka and they eventually get married (although in the first season, Latka marries an American prostitute strictly to avoid being deported back to his home country). Latka is also shown being visited by his mother, who develops an attraction to Alex Rieger, much to Latka's annoyance. 

Latka's dissociative identity disorder was conceived late in the series as a result of Kaufman expressing boredom at portraying Latka. This allowed him to broaden his comedic abilities with alternate personas such as the womanising American Vic Ferrari, the cowboy Harlow, the elegant Englishman Sir Geoffrey, and even Alex Rieger himself. In these episodes, Latka's different personas have no idea that they are the same person, and Vic even talks about Latka as if he knows him personally. While he is Alex, Latka experiences Alex's problems in life and at one point even finds the right solution to them, but comically reverts to Latka before he can tell the real Alex. Around the same time as his marriage to Simka, Latka's alternate personalities are completely eradicated by Doctor Joyce Brothers and do not appear again for the remainder of the series.  

In a two-part episode in the fifth season of the series, Latka is forced to have sex with a woman to stop her from dying of hypothermia with his body heat, and Simka contemplates doing the same with Alex in order to "repair" their marriage. When she cannot, they comically divorce and subsequently marry again with a "clean slate".

In other media
Latka Gravas appears in the second issue of Dean Motter's comic series Terminal City.

Latka Gravas also appears as an attire for Andy Kaufman in the video game Showdown: Legends of Wrestling.

References

 

Andy Kaufman
Comedy television characters
Fictional characters with dissociative identity disorder
Fictional immigrants to the United States
Fictional mechanics
Fictional people with acquired American citizenship
Taxi (TV series) characters
Male characters in television
Television characters introduced in 1978